Desisa takasagoana is a species of beetle in the family Cerambycidae. It was described by Masaki Matsushita in 1933.

References

Desisa
Beetles described in 1933